Fígols is a municipality in the comarca of the Berguedà in 
Catalonia, Spain. It is situated to the north of Cercs, in the mountains above the Llobregat valley. 
Deposits of lignite are extracted commercially.

Nearby is the Cercs Mine Museum.

The guerrilla leader Ramon Vila Capdevila - last of the Spanish Maquis, who held out from the end of the Spanish Civil War until being killed in 1963 - is buried in Fígols. On 15 July 2000, a plaque was placed at the burial site of Vila which reads
.

Demography

References

Works cited
 
 
 Panareda Clopés, Josep Maria; Rios Calvet, Jaume; Rabella Vives, Josep Maria (1989). Guia de Catalunya, Barcelona: Caixa de Catalunya.  (Spanish).  (Catalan).

External links
 Government data pages 

Municipalities in Berguedà